Chindodi Leela (1943 – 21 January 2010) was an Indian stage and film actress, politician, and writer from Karnataka.

Family
Leela was born in 1943 at Davangere, Karnataka into a family of professional theater artists. Her father Chindodi Veerappa had established the K.B.R. Drama Company in 1928. Her first play was at the age of 8 as young Siddharama in the play Shivayogi Siddharama (1951)

Over 10,000 performances were held of a play she wrote, Halli Hudugi, with which she revived her family's drama company, making it one of the biggest professional drama troupes in Karnataka.

Career 
Leela has acted in over 32 movies that include Kittur Chennamma, Gaali Gopura, Krishnadevaraya and Sharapanjara, Puttana Kanagal’s Sharapanjara, Tumbida Koda and Gaanayogi Panchakshari Gavayi She rose to fame with her performances in  Shakuntala, Lankadahana, Matanga Kanye, Hemareddy Malamma, Gunasagari, Veera Babruvahana, and Belli Bangara in subsequent year. In 2000, she toured United States and United Kingdom with the help of Government of Karnataka to promote her plays Kitturu Chennamma, Tippu Sultan, and Jagajyothi Basa- veshwara 

She produced a film, Hamsalekha, about Panchakshari Gavaayi, a blind musician, which won numerous central government and state awards.She was developing the young kids in drama "HASYA KALAHA" from the school of RJS in Ravindrakalkshithra "

She ran the Karnataka Nataka Academy for more than three decades, acted in more than 20 films, and was a member of the Karnataka Legislative Council.

She head the drama company Kari Basava Rajendra (KBR) drama company. She was made the Nataka Academi chief in 1992 by then chief minister S Bangarappa

Death
Leela suffered a heart attack and had undergone coronary artery bypass surgery on 18 January 2010, and died three days later, on 21 January 2010, aged 72. Leela was cremated on 23 January 2010 near Davanagere.

Chindodi Rangaloka 
A small green park on the outskirts of Davangere, a first of its kind in the country to preserve the legacy of a theatre personality. At the center of the part is a tall statue of Leela, the figurines installed across the park give a peek into the versatility of the actor, interior walls bear the pictures of famous roles played by Chindodi Leela, and the exteriors sport drawings that depict the rural life, and above all, a Ranga Dhwaj, a ceremonial flag depicting theater.

Awards 

 Chittakarshaka Abhinetri- 1962
 Abhinaya Samrajni- 1965
 Rangabhoomi Saraswati- 1971
 Abhinava Kitturu Channamma- 1982
 Karnataka Rajyotsava Award – 1985
 Pratibha Paripoorne- 1986
 Padma Shri – 1988
 Kala Praveene – 1992
 K V Shankare Gowda Award- 1993
 Karnataka Nataka Academy Award- 1994
 Indira Priyadarshini Award- 1995
 Karnataka State Film Award for Best Film for Sangeetha Sagara Ganayogi Panchakshara Gavai – 1995-96 (As producer)
 Abhinaya Veer Mahile – 1999
 Kala Tapaswini – 1999
 Gubbi Veeranna Award – 2002
 Akhil Bharat Sharan Sahitya Prashasti – 2003
 Katyayini Samman Award by Nadoj Pratisthan- 2003
 Shri Krishna Devaraya Award – 2005
 Sangeet Natak Akademi Award – 2006
 Keladi Channamma Award – 2008

References

External links
Chindodi Leela interview with Theatre Pasta magazine

1937 births
2010 deaths
Indian film actresses
Actresses in Kannada cinema
Women writers from Karnataka
Writers from Karnataka
Kannada people
Actresses from Karnataka
Indian actor-politicians
Members of the Karnataka Legislative Council
Recipients of the Padma Shri in arts
Women in Karnataka politics
20th-century Indian actresses
20th-century Indian women writers
20th-century Indian writers
20th-century Indian women politicians
20th-century Indian politicians
Indian stage actresses
Actresses in Kannada theatre
Recipients of the Sangeet Natak Akademi Award